Black Is Black is the debut album by Spanish beat music group, Los Bravos. The album features its title track, an international hit. The album was originally released in 1966, but track listing differs in UK and US. The CD of the US version was reissued in 2000. The CD of the UK version was reissued in 2003 with 13 bonus tracks.

The album became a moderate success after it charted at #93 on the Billboard 200.

Track listing

Original US album
 "Black is Black" (Michelle Grainger, Steve Wadey, Tony Hayes)
 "Trapped" (Bill Martin, Phil Coulter)
 "Baby, Baby Baby"	(Ivor Raymonde, Manolo Diaz)
 "Make It Easy for Me"	(Diaz, Colin Butler)
 "She Believes in Me" (Dario Bembo, Peter Callander, Vito Pallavicini)
 "I Want a Name" (Raymonde, Diaz)
 "I Don't Care" (Raymonde, Tony Clarke)
 "Stop That Girl" (Butler, Diaz)
 "I'm Cuttin' Out"	(Coulter, Martin)
 "Don't Be Left Out in the Cold" (Diaz, Marcel Stellman)
 "You Won't Get Far" (Butler, Diaz)
 "Baby, Believe Me" (Raymonde, Diaz)

Original UK album
 "Black is Black"
 "Trapped"
 "Baby, Baby"	
 "Make It Easy For Me"	
 "She Believes in Me"
 "Will You Always Love Me"	
 "Stop That Girl"	
 "Give Me a Chance"	
 "I'm Cuttin' Out"	
 "Two Kinds of Lover"	
 "You Won't Get Far"		
 "Baby Believe Me"

CD bonus tracks on UK album
 "I Want a Name"	
 "Going Nowhere"	
 "Brand New Baby"	
 "I Don't Care"
 "Don't Be Left Out in the Cold"	
 "I'm All Ears"	
 "You'll Never Get the Chance Again"	
 "Bring a Little Lovin'"	
 "Make It Last"
 "Like Nobody Else"	
 "Sympathy"	
 "Just Holding On"	
 "Dirty Street"

Personnel 
Mike Kennedy Kogel - lead vocals
Antonio Martínez - guitar
Manuel Fernández - electric organ
Miguel Vicens Danús - bass guitar
Pablo Gómez - drums

References

1966 debut albums
Los Bravos albums
Decca Records albums